Samuel P. Taylor State Park is a state park located in Marin County, California.

History

The park is named for Samuel Penfield Taylor, who found gold during the California Gold Rush and used some of his money to buy a parcel of land along Lagunitas Creek.  In 1856, Taylor built the Pioneer Paper Mill, the first paper mill on the Pacific Coast. In the 1870s, the North Pacific Coast Railroad was built between Cazadero and a pier in Sausalito where passengers could transfer to a ferry to San Francisco. The railroad passed near Taylor's mill, and, ever the entrepreneur, he built the "Camp Taylor Resort" alongside the tracks. A destination for San Franciscans, the resort offered both a hotel and tent camping, as well as swimming, boating, fishing, and a dance pavilion.

Taylor died on January 22, 1886, and his family lost the mill and resort in the Panic of 1893. However, a 1910 newspaper advertisement for the "Camp Taylor Resort," touting its dance pavilion and on-site grocery and butcher, indicates that the resort continued to operate. The mill burned down in 1916, and in 1945 the State of California took possession of the property for non-payment of taxes.

During the state budget deficit, Taylor Park was one of many state parks that were at risk of closing due to lack of funding. Efforts were made to find funding to keep Samuel P. Taylor and other parks open. The San Francisco Chronicle, on October 7, 2011, reported that "the National Park Service has agreed to take over security and operations of Samuel P. Taylor Park."

Notes

External links

San Francisco Wiki - Samuel P. Taylor State Park Maps, hiking trails, winter run coho salmon
Trailspotting: Hiking Mount Barnabe GPS/mapping data, hike description & photos

State parks of California
Parks in Marin County, California
Protected areas established in 1945
1945 establishments in California
Bay Area Ridge Trail